Rajesh Chithira is an Indian poet, short story writer and novelist who  writes in Malayalam language. Born in Pathanamthitta, in the south Indian state of Kerala, he has published anthologies containing poems and short stories such as Unmathathakalude Crash Landingukal, Tequila, Ulipechu and Jigsaw Puzzle and a children's novel, Aadi and Athma. He has received a number of awards which include Indian Ruminations Poetry Award, Bharat Murali Poetry Award, Galleria Award, Ezhuthola Award, Expatriate Book Trust Award, and Souhrudham Dot Com Award.

Born to V. N. Ramachandran and Santhamma as their eldest son, Rajesh Chithira is married to Nisha and the couple has two daughters, Akshaya and Saimeera. He lives in Dubai, in the United Arab Emirates.

Selected bibliography

See also 

 Karunakaran (Malayalam writer)
 P. F. Mathews

References

Further reading

External links 
 
 
 
 
 

People from Kerala
Malayalam novelists
Malayalam-language writers
Indian male novelists
Indian male short story writers
Living people
21st-century Indian novelists
21st-century Indian short story writers
21st-century Indian poets
Novelists from Kerala
20th-century Indian male writers
21st-century Indian male writers
Year of birth missing (living people)
Malayali people
Malayalam poets